Amir Hussain Lone (born 1990) is an armless cricketer from Bijbehara village in Jammu and Kashmir. He is known for being an armless cricketer and the captain of the Jammu and Kashmir para-cricket team.

Career
Lone lost his hand at the age of 8 in 1997, due to his family's sawmill. Despite this setback, he still began playing cricket with his legs and quickly became known for his unique and innovative style of play.

In 2013, Lone's team played in Delhi against the Kerala cricket team. He made headlines for his performance, as he was able to bat by putting his bat between his neck and chin and bowl with his legs.

References

Cricketers from Jammu and Kashmir
1990 births
Living people
People from Bijbehara